Senior Advocate of Nigeria (SAN) is a title that may be conferred on legal practitioners in Nigeria of not less than ten years' standing and who have distinguished themselves in the legal profession. It is the equivalent of the rank of Queen's Counsel in the United Kingdom, from which Nigeria became independent in 1960 (Republic 1963), as well as in South Australia, the Northern Territory, and Canada (except Ontario and Quebec). Several countries use similar designations such as Senior Counsel, President's Counsel, State Counsel, Senior Advocate, and President's Advocate. A Senior Advocate of Nigeria is said to have been admitted to the "Inner Bar", as distinguished from the "Outer", or "Utter", Bar, consisting of junior advocates (See Call to the bar).

The conferment is made in accordance with the Legal Practitioners Act 207 Section 5 (1) by the Legal Practitioners' Privileges Committee, headed by the Chief Justice (as Chairman), and consist of the Attorney-General, one Justice of the Supreme Court (chosen by the Chief Justice and the Attorney-General for a term of two years, renewable on one occasion only), the President of the Court of Appeal, five of the Chief Judges of the States (chosen by the Chief Justice and the Attorney-General for a term of two years, renewable on one occasion only), the Chief Judge of the Federal High Court, and five legal practitioners who are Senior Advocates of Nigeria (chosen by the Chief Justice and the Attorney-General for a term of two years, renewable on one occasion only).

The title was first conferred on April 3, 1975. The recipients were Chief F.R.A. Williams and Dr Nabo Graham-Douglas. As of July 7, 2011 344 lawyers had become Senior Advocates of Nigeria. Chief (Mrs.) Folake Solanke is the first female recipient of the rank of SAN 6 years after in 1981.

Since 1975, a varying number of advocates in Nigeria have consecutively been conferred with the rank, with the exception of years- 1976, 1977 and 1994. The conferment is however restricted to fewer than 30 advocates per annum and is made by the Chief Justice of Nigeria on the recommendations of the Legal Practitioners’ Privileges Committee.

As of 9 September 2019, a total of 526 advocates had become Senior Advocates of Nigeria.

References

Law of Nigeria
Senior Advocates of Nigeria